Aeolium or Aioleion was a town of Chalcidice in ancient Macedonia. It belonged to the Delian League since it appears in the tribute registry of Athens for the years 434/3, 433/2 and 429/8 BCE, where it paid a phoros of 500 drachmas. It also appears in a treaty of alliance between the Athenians and Bottiaeans dated to 422 BCE, from which it is deduced that it belonged to the territory of Bottiaea. However, in a fragment of Theopompus collected by Stephanus of Byzantium, Aeolium is cited as a city of the Thracian Chersonesus.

Its site is near modern Bottike.

References

Populated places in ancient Macedonia
Former populated places in Greece
Geography of ancient Chalcidice
Members of the Delian League
Bottiaea